John Wharton (born John Hall-Stevenson; 21 June 1765 – 29 May 1843) was a British landowner and MP.

He was born the eldest son of Joseph William Hall-Stevenson of Skelton, in the North Riding of Yorkshire and educated at the Royal School, Armagh, Trinity College, Dublin and Lincoln's Inn. He succeeded his father in 1786, inheriting the ruinous Skelton Castle.

In 1788 he took the surname of Wharton only by sign manual on succeeding to the fortune and estates of his aunt, Mrs Margaret Wharton. He then demolished the old Skelton Castle and between 1788 and 1817 built a similarly named Gothic country house in its place.

He served as the Whig MP for Beverley from 1790 to 1796 and again from 1802 to 1826. By 1829 he was in debt and spent the next 14 years in the Fleet Debtors Prison, where he died childless in 1843.

He had married Susan Mary Anne, the daughter of General John Lambton of Lambton, County Durham. He had two daughters who both predeceased him and was succeeded by his nephew, John Thomas Wharton.

References

External links 
 

1765 births
1843 deaths
Members of the Parliament of Great Britain for English constituencies
British MPs 1790–1796
Members of the Parliament of the United Kingdom for English constituencies
UK MPs 1802–1806
UK MPs 1806–1807
UK MPs 1807–1812
UK MPs 1812–1818
UK MPs 1818–1820
UK MPs 1820–1826
Alumni of Trinity College Dublin
People educated at The Royal School, Armagh
People from Redcar and Cleveland
Whig (British political party) MPs